Aleksi Salonen (born February 3, 1993) is a Finnish professional ice hockey defenceman. He is currently playing for Graz99ers of the ICE Hockey League (ICEHL).

Salonen made his SM-liiga debut playing with JYP Jyväskylä during the 2012–13 SM-liiga season.

Following his tenth season in the Finnish Liiga, Salonen signed his first contract abroad in agreeing to a one-year deal with Austrian club, Graz99ers of the ICE Hockey League, on 21 July 2022.

References

External links

1993 births
Living people
Finnish ice hockey defencemen
Graz 99ers players
JYP-Akatemia players
JYP Jyväskylä players
Mikkelin Jukurit players
People from Muurame
Tappara players
HC TPS players
Sportspeople from Central Finland